Lycée Molière de Rio de Janeiro is a French international school in Laranjeiras, Rio de Janeiro, Brazil. The school serves maternelle (preschool) through the final year of lycée (senior high school), terminale. As of 2015 the school has over 750 students.

See also
 French Brazilian

References

External links
  Lycée Molière
  Lycée Molière

European-Brazilian culture in Rio de Janeiro (city)
International schools in Rio de Janeiro (city)
French international schools in Brazil
Molière